Serge Jolimeau is a Haitian metal sculptor born in Croix-des-Bouquets, Haiti in 1952. Renowned artists such as Georges Liautaud, Murat Brierre, the Louis-Juste brothers, and Gabriel Bien-Aimé were also from this same village.

Biography

Jolimeau was an apprentice under Seresier Louis-Juste after high school, and joined the Centre d’Art, Haiti, in 1972 where he met his mentor Murat Brierre. He stands out with Gabriel Bien-Aimé as one of the most gifted metal sculptors (traditional sculptural art of carved metal, particularly from steel drums, inaugurated in Haiti by Georges Liautaud) of his generation. Jolimeau's stylization and fantastic complexity, grounded in voodoo inspiration, tends to produce works giving the impression of a metal lace. In 2009, Jolimeau along with Micah Ramil Remy and Toyin Folorunso were artists selected by Bill Clinton to create commemorative works for the Clinton Global Citizen Awards as part of the Clinton Global Initiative. At the end of 2010, following the Haiti earthquake and in cooperation with the Clinton Global Initiative, Macy's agreed to sell Croix-des-Bouquetes artisan created works from Jolimeau's shop in their stores throughout the United States. His artwork has been exhibited internationally since 1979. Jolimeau has participated in the Santa Fe International Folk Art Market annually since 2005.

Principal expositions
 1979 - Kunst aus Haiti, Staatlichen Kunsthalle, Berlin
 1992 - A Haitian Celebration: Art and Culture, Milwaukee Art Museum, Milwaukee
 1995 - Masterworks in Haitian Art from the Collection of the Davenport Museum, Davenport Museum of Art, Davenport
 1997 - Haitian Art: Twenty Years of Collecting at the Waterloo Museum of Art, Waterloo Museum of Art, Waterloo, Iowa
 1998 - Caribe: Exclusión, fragmentación y paraíso, Casa de America y Museo Extremeno Iberoamericano de Arte Contemporaneo, Madrid
 2000 - Island Delights: The Spirit and Passion of Haitian Art, Tampa Museum of Art, Tampa
 2004 - Lespri Endepandan: Discovering Haitian Sculpture, Frost Art Museum, Florida International University, Miami
 2008 - Off the Wall, Pan American Art Projects, Miami
 2012 - Outside the Box, Pan American Art Projects, Miami

Public collections

Brooklyn Museum
 Crucifixion scene, 1981
Milwaukee Art Museum
Démon, 1977
Spencer Museum of Art :
Man and Goat
See Goddesses
Siren
Winged Stag
Figge Art Museum:
Lasiren et la Bête
Capricorne
Croix Vaudou
Crucifix
Crucifixion
Femme légère
La Diablesse
Le Démon Ailé
Les Deux Sorcières
Les Trois Hermaphrodites
Rooster Mounting a Law
Turtle Woman
Waterloo Center for the Arts:
Metamorphosis
Sun and Birds
Spirit Possession
La Siren
Papa Damballah and Aida Ouedo
Crucifixion
Crucifixion
Siren
Man and Horse
Woman and Bird
Bird and Horse
Angel and Bird
Male Figure
Merbird
Horse and Fish
Sirene
Mounted Figure
Sirene
Mother Angel and Child

References

Note: the majority of the initial article was translated from the French Wikipedia article "Serge Jolimeau"

External links
Haiti Cultural Recovery Project: Centre d’Art  from the Smithsonian Institution
Serge Jolimeau - Haiti: Scuplteur sur métal découpé images from Galerie Fallet

1952 births
20th-century Haitian sculptors
Date of birth missing (living people)
Haitian sculptors
Living people
People from Ouest (department)